The Geneseo Knights (also known as the SUNY Geneseo Knights or the Geneseo State Knights) are composed of 19 varsity teams (7 men's 12 women's) representing the State University of New York at Geneseo (SUNY Geneseo) in intercollegiate athletics. All teams compete at the NCAA Division III level and all teams compete in the State University of New York Athletic Conference (SUNYAC). In men's ice hockey the Geneseo Knights are known as the Geneseo Ice Knights.

Background 
The Geneseo Knights has 19 varsity sports programs including basketball ((M)en's and (W)omen's), cross country (M, W), equestrian (W), field hockey (W), ice hockey (M), lacrosse (M, W), soccer (M, W), softball (W), swimming and diving (M, W), tennis (W), indoor/outdoor track & field (M, W), and volleyball (W).

Sports Sponsored

NCAA Division III Sports

National championships

Team

Club Sports 
Although they are not NCAA programs, Geneseo also has 23 competitive club sports teams that compete in intercollegiate play as well as teams for recreational participants. Some of these clubs include rowing, rugby, baseball, soccer, tennis, cheerleading, badminton and golf.

Intramural Sports 
There are also 27 intramural sport offerings, such as broomball.

References 

State University of New York at Geneseo
College sports in New York (state)